The 2018–19 Basketball Championship of Bosnia and Herzegovina was the 18th season of this championship, with 11 teams from Bosnia and Herzegovina participating in it. Zrinjski was the defending champion. Široki won its tenth league title.

Competition format
Eleven teams would join the regular season, played with as double round-robin tournament. Igokea, participant in the 2018–19 Adriatic League First Division, would not join the competition.

Teams and locations

Regular season

Standings

Results

Group for the title

League table

Results

Relegation group

Standings

Results

Playoffs
Semifinals will be played in a best-of-three games format, while the final in a best-of-five (2-2-1) format.

Bracket
Source: Basketball Federation of BiH

Semi-finals

|}

Finals

|}

References

External links
Official website

Basketball Championship of Bosnia and Herzegovina
Bosnia
Bas